Burgenländisches Schulungszentrum (BUZ) is an adult education college in Neutal, Austria, offering full-time and part-time courses in areas such as metal technology, electrical engineering, IT and reintegration.

History 
In 1975 the Burgenländisches Schulungszentrum was built and metal technology and electrical engineering courses have been held.

Organisation 
Burgenländisches Schulungszentrum is supported by:
 Republic of Austria represented by the local Arbeitsmarktservice
 Austrian Chamber of Labour
 Austrian Federal Economic Chamber
 Burgenländische Landesregierung
 Neutal

Executive Board 
 Chairman: WHR DI Hans Godowitsch
members:
 Gerhard Michalitsch
 Mag. Josef Stiglitz
 Mag. Klaus Trummer
 Erich Trummer (mayor of Neutal)
 Mag. (FH) Christian Vlasich

Courses 
Burgenländisches Schulungszentrum offers over 50 courses including subjects in the areas of information and communications technology, electrical engineering], metal technology. The college also offers specialist areas, including courses for people with learning difficulties.

External links
 BUZ website
 Austrian Federal Economic Chamber
 Austrian Chamber of Labour
 Burgenländische Landesregierung
 Gemeinde Neutal
 Arbeitsmarktservice Österreich (AMS)

Adult education
Educational organisations based in Austria